Another Day on The Terrace is the first full-length album by German electronic composer and producer Roger-Pierre Shah released under his alias 'Sunlounger'.

Track listing

Personnel
Jörg Stenzel – guitar on 'White Sand', 'Aguas Blancas', 'Hierbas Ibicencas' & 'Lumumba'
 Zara Taylor – vocals on 'Crawling'
 Britta Medeiros - vocals on 'Shine on Me'

External links 
 , 
 Another Day On The Terrace album review on Trance Hub

2007 albums
Roger Shah albums
Armada Music albums